Piotr Moss (born 13 May 1949 in Bydgoszcz) is a Polish composer of contemporary classical music.

Since 1981, he has lived in Paris and since 1984 has been a French citizen.

Moss studied in Poland with Piotr Perkowski, Grażyna Bacewicz, Krzysztof Penderecki and, from the late 1970s onwards, in Paris with Nadia Boulanger.

His important work as a composer is characterized by a permanent search for new sounds and new eclectic stylistic associations in a genre related to Alfred Schnittke's style of music.

In 2011, his concerto for clarinet d' un silence... was recorded by Jean-Marc Fessard.

See the Polish article to have a complete list of Moss' compositions.

Awards and recognition
Piotr Moss received a number of main awards an various musical competitions in Poland, France, and elsewhere.

He is also a recipient of the following major awards and decorations:
2000: Knight of the Ordre des Arts et des Lettres (Order of Arts and Letters), France
2009 Decoration of Honor Meritorious for Polish Culture.
2009: Special award from the Ministry of Culture and National Heritage (Poland) on the occasion of the 60th anniversary and 40 years of musical work
2016: Officer of the Ordre des Arts et des Lettres (Order of Arts and Letters), France

References

External links 
 Piotr Moss on cdmc
 Piotr Moss on France Musique
 Piotr Moss on Cézame Music Agency
 Piotr Moss on Music Me
 Piotr Moss on YouTube

1949 births
Living people
Musicians from Bydgoszcz
French classical composers
French male classical composers
Polish male classical composers
Chevaliers of the Ordre des Arts et des Lettres
Officiers of the Ordre des Arts et des Lettres
Polish emigrants to France